Cristian Vega may refer to:

 Cristian Vega (One Life to Live), fictional character on One Life to Live
 Cristian Vega (footballer, born 1979), Argentine defender
 Cristian Vega (footballer, born 1993), Argentine midfielder